Crime Busters is a 1977 Italian action crime comedy film directed by Enzo Barboni and starring the comedy team of Terence Hill and Bud Spencer.

It was one of the three movies awarded with the Golden Screen Award in 1977 along with The Exorcist and The Towering Inferno.

Plot
Wilbur Walsh (Bud Spencer) and Matt Kirby (Terence Hill) are in Miami, looking for work as longshoremen, but the area is managed by shady dealers who refuse to give them a job, after which the dealers are beaten up and have three of their cars wrecked in the process. Walsh and Kirby meet up and then leave the dock, tired of looking for a job. Matt is particularly intrigued by the closed nature of Wilbur, who tries to avoid it in any way. Matt, after introducing himself, suggests that Walsh and he should work together on something he had been planning; the robbery of a supermarket. Walsh accepts, aided by Kirby's conniving ways to remove police attention, but by mistake the two end up in the police station and, to prevent being locked away, they say that they want to become police officers, which is granted.

Both Matt and Wilbur complete their training, even though they differ in their unorthodox methods of making arrests and overall rebellious nature, eventually being on real service. During their job, Kirby becomes familiar with a Chinese family whose uncle was killed by unknown assailants. Upon investigation, the two come to face the same ruffians that spread to the port and denied them a job before. In fact, the criminals will be the key of "the two superpied almost flat" to get to the heart of the gang of traffickers.

Cast

Reception
In a contemporary review, Monthly Film Bulletin called Crime Busters "a singularly dull variation on the sprightly, sparring Newman/Redford comedy formula" and that there are a few original ideas in the script, but they were "largely wasted by the lacklustre direction and the film's inevitable drift into an endless series of unimaginatively choreographed punch-ups."

From retrospective reviews, AllMovie called the film "light but likeable stuff" and that the appeal of the film depends "solely on one's opinion of Hill and Spencer's antics." The review also noted supporting roles, noting David Huddleston and Laura Gemser. The review concluded that the film was "shaggy around the edges but fans of slapstick humor will find it endearing enough to pull them through."

The film, along with most films of the Bud Spencer & Terence Hill duo, enjoys cult status in many countries in Europe, especially in Hungary and Germany. This is partially due to the dubbing.

References

External links

1977 films
1970s crime comedy films
Italian crime comedy films
Films scored by Guido & Maurizio De Angelis
Terence Hill and Bud Spencer
1970s police comedy films
Films set in Miami
Films shot in Rome
Films shot in Milan
Films shot in Miami
1970s buddy cop films
1977 comedy films
1970s Italian films